Argyrotaenia subcordillerae is a species of moth of the family Tortricidae. It is found in Ecuador in the provinces of Carchi and Pastaza.

The wingspan is 18.5–21 mm. The ground colour of the forewings is whitish in the posterior half of the wing and pale pinkish ochreous in the anterior part. The suffusions are brownish, the dots and strigulae (fine streaks) are brown and the markings are blackish brown. The hindwings are brownish grey, but paler basally.

Etymology
The species name refers to the similarity with Argyrotaenia cordillerae plus Latin sub (meaning near, close).

References

S
Endemic fauna of Ecuador
Tortricidae of South America
Moths described in 2008